This is a list of defunct airlines of Luxembourg.

See also
 List of airlines of Luxembourg
 List of airports in Luxembourg

References

Luxembourg
Airlines
Airlines, defunct